Love in the 4th Dimension is the debut studio album by British indie rock band The Big Moon, released on 7 April 2017 by Columbia Records and Fiction Records. The album was recorded at Eastcote Studios in London with producer Catherine Marks. The album was recorded across 12 days so the band could go with their first instincts musically. Prior to the album's release the tracks "Cupid", "Silent Movie Susie", "Formidable" and "Sucker" were released as singles, the latter of which being a re-recording of the band's debut single. The band toured Europe in spring 2017 to celebrate the album's release.

Promotion and release
Love in the 4th Dimension was officially announced on 16 November 2016, when the single "Formidable" premiered on Annie Mac's Hottest Record. Despite this the track was actually the third single released from the album. The first single was the song "Cupid" released on 29 March 2016. "Cupid"'s accompanying music video was released a month later released on 24 April. It was the first song the band released after signing to Fiction Records. The track was described by front woman Jules Jackson as being about "when you really really want something or someone and you launch yourself into getting it - preening yourself, preparing, fantasising the blissful future, convincing yourself that you’re ready for it and you bravely throw yourself into a new situation - only to find that despite all that careful planning your nerves can still get the better of you." The second single released was the track "Silent Movie Susie" released on 26 July 2016. The track was premiered on BBC Radio 1 by Huw Stephens. It was described by Robin Murray from Clash Magazine as being "reminiscent of Elastica, or even elements of The Libertines". The third single released was the track "Formidable" which was premiered by Radio 1 on Annie Mac's Hottest Record. It was also released on a 7" vinyl on 13 January 2017 with the track "Hold This" being the B-side. Jules described the song as being about "being strong for someone who’s going through a hard time, and it's saying 'I'm here, you can talk to me, I'll be strong for you, you don’t have to hold it inside'. The fourth single released was the track "Sucker", a re-recording of the band's debut single originally released on 29 April 2015.

Critical reception 

Love in the 4th Dimension received positive reviews from music critics. At Metacritic, which assigns a normalised rating out of 100 to reviews from mainstream critics, the album received a positive score of 77, based on five reviews.

Harriet Gibson of The Guardian said "The golden age of indie might be over, but The Big Moon are resuscitating its corpse for one last hurrah", and added that the band "amplifies the emotional carnage" of "nostalgia for noughties". Will Hodgkinson of The Times called the album "a rousing ode to being young and having fun".

Reef Younis of Loud and Quiet said that the album "captures the kind of happy exuberance you get from watching Pixar films, remembering criminally underrated Brit-pop acts and/or catching a favourite song on an episode of Teachers".

Accolades

Track listing
All tracks written by Jules Jackson.

Personnel 
Credits adapted from Love in the 4th Dimension liner notes.

The Big Moon
 Juliette Jackson – guitar, vocals, songwriting
Soph Nathann – guitar, vocals
Celia Archer – bass, vocals
Fern Ford – drums

Additional musicians
 Beatrice Archer – violin (track 11)
 Nick Holland – cello (track 11)

Design
Charlotte Patmore – photography
Stewart Armstrong – design
Alice Waltz – pattern design

Production
 Catherine Marks  – production (1, 2, 3, 4, 5, 7, 8, 9, 10, 11, 12, 13), mixing (track 3)
Juliette Jackson – co-production (1, 2, 5, 6, 7, 9, 10, 11, 13), production (track 15)
The Big Moon – production (track 6, 12, 14)
Adam 'Cecil' Bartlett – additional production (track 9, 10, 11, 13), engineering (track 1, 2, 5, 7, 9, 13)
Andy Hughes – engineering assistance (track 1, 2, 5, 7, 9, 13)
Craig Silvey – mixing (track 1, 2, 4, 5, 6, 7, 8, 9, 13)
Max Prior – mixing assistance (track 1, 2, 5, 6, 7, 9, 13)
John Catlin – engineering (track 3, 4, 8)
Kristian Donaldson  – engineering assistance (track 3)
Richie Kennedy  – engineering assistance (track 4, 8)
Eduardo de la Paz Canel  – mixing (track 12), mixing assistance (track 4, 8)
George Murphy  – engineering (track 6, 15), mixing (track 15)
Greg Calvi  – mastering
Mark Bishop  – engineering (track 12)
Josh Faulkner  – engineering assistance (track 12)
John Davis  – mastering (track 12, 15)
Rory Attwell  – mastering (track 13, 14), production (track 14), engineering (track 14), mixing (track 14)

Recording
 Recorded at Eastcote Studios

Charts

References 

2017 debut albums
The Big Moon albums
Fiction Records albums
Albums produced by Catherine Marks